Parks College may refer to:

Parks College, Oxford, a graduate college of the University of Oxford, established in 2019
Parks College, one of multiple colleges combined to make Everest College
Parks College Airline
Parks College of Engineering, Aviation and Technology at Saint Louis University